Bologovsky (masculine), Bologovskaya (feminine), or Bologovskoye (neuter) may refer to:
Bologovsky District, a district of Tver Oblast, Russia
Bologovskaya, a rural locality (a village) in Arkhangelsk Oblast, Russia